The Sustainable Development Goals or Global Goals are a collection of seventeen interlinked objectives designed to serve as a "shared blueprint for peace and prosperity for people and the planet now and into the future". The SDGs are: no poverty; zero hunger; good health and well-being; quality education; gender equality; clean water and sanitation; affordable and clean energy; decent work and economic growth; industry, innovation and infrastructure; reduced inequalities; sustainable cities and communities; responsible consumption and production; climate action; life below water; life on land; peace, justice, and strong institutions; and partnerships for the goals. The SDGs emphasize the interconnected environmental, social and economic aspects of sustainable development by putting sustainability at their center. 

The SDGs were formulated in 2015 by the United Nations General Assembly (UNGA) as part of the Post-2015 Development Agenda, which sought to create a future global development framework to succeed the Millennium Development Goals, which ended that year. They were formally articulated and adopted in a UNGA resolution called the 2030 Agenda, known colloquially as Agenda 2030. On 6 July 2017, the SDGs were made more actionable by a UNGA resolution that identifies specific targets for each goal and provides indicators to measure progress. Most targets are to be achieved by 2030, although some have no end date. 

There are cross-cutting issues and synergies between the different goals; for example, for SDG 13 on climate action, the IPCC sees robust synergies with SDGs 3 (health), 7 (clean energy), 11 (cities and communities), 12 (responsible consumption and production) and 14 (oceans). Conversely, critics and observers have also identified trade-offs between the goals,such as between ending hunger and promoting environmental sustainability. Other concerns include there being too many goals (resulting in compounding trade-offs), a weak emphasis on environmental sustainability, and difficulties tracking qualitative indicators. 

The SDGs are monitored by the UN High-Level Political Forum on Sustainable Development (HLPF), an annual forum held under the auspices of the United Nations Economic and Social Council. However, the HLPF comes with its own set of problems due to a lack of political leadership and divergent national interests. To facilitate monitoring of progress on SDG implementation, the online SDG Tracker was launched in June 2018 to present all available data across all indicators. The COVID-19 pandemic had serious negative impacts on all 17 SDGs in 2020. A scientific assessment on the political impacts of the SDGs found in 2022 that the SDGs have only had limited transformative political impact thus far. At the very least, they have affected the way actors understand and communicate about sustainable development.

Adoption 

On 25 September 2015, the 193 countries of the UN General Assembly adopted the 2030 Development Agenda titled "Transforming our world: the 2030 Agenda for Sustainable Development". This agenda has 92 paragraphs. Paragraph 59 outlines the 17 Sustainable Development Goals and the associated 169 targets and 232 indicators.

The UN-led process involved its 193 Member States and global civil society. The resolution is a broad intergovernmental agreement that acts as the Post-2015 Development Agenda. The SDGs build on the principles agreed upon in Resolution A/RES/66/288, entitled "The Future We Want". This was a non-binding document released as a result of Rio+20 Conference held in 2012.

Implementation 
Implementation of the SDGs started worldwide in 2016. This process can also be called Localizing the SDGs. In 2019 António Guterres (secretary-general of the United Nations) issued a global call for a Decade of Action to deliver the Sustainable Development Goals by 2030. This decade will last from 2020 to 2030. The plan is that the secretary general of the UN will convene an annual platform for driving the Decade of Action.

There are two main types of actors for implementation of the SDGs: state and non-state actors. State actors include national governments and sub-national authorities, whereas non-state actors are corporations and civil society. Civil society participation and empowerment is important but there are also diverse interests in this group. 

Building new partnerships is useful. However, the SDGs are not legally binding and purposefully designed to provide much leeway for actors. Therefore, they can interpret the goals differently and often according to their interests.

Content of the 17 goals

Structure of goals, targets and indicators 

The lists of targets and indicators for each of the 17 SDGs was published in a UN resolution in July 2017. Each goal typically has 812 targets, and each target has between one and four indicators used to measure progress toward reaching the targets, with the average of 1.5 indicators per target. The targets are either outcome targets (circumstances to be attained) or means of implementation targets. The latter targets were introduced late in the process of negotiating the SDGs to address the concern of some Member States about how the SDGs were to be achieved. Goal 17 is wholly about how the SDGs will be achieved.

The numbering system of targets is as follows: Outcome targets use numbers, whereas means of implementation targets use lower case letters. For example, SDG 6 has a total of 8 targets. The first six are outcome targets and are labeled Targets 6.1 to 6.6. The final two targets are means of implementation targets and are labeled as Targets 6.a and 6.b.

The United Nations Statistics Division (UNSD) website provides a current official indicator list which includes all updates until the 51st session Statistical Commission in March 2020.

The indicators for the targets have varying levels of methodological development and availability of data at the global level. Initially, some indicators (called Tier 3 indicators) had no internationally established methodology or standards. Later, the global indicator framework was adjusted so that Tier 3 indicators were either abandoned, replaced or refined.  As of 17 July 2020, there were 231 unique indicators.

Data or information must address all vulnerable groups such as children, elderly folks, persons with disabilities, refugees, indigenous peoples, migrants, and internally-displaced persons.

Reviews of indicators 
The indicator framework was comprehensively reviewed at the 51st session of the United Nations Statistical Commission in 2020. It will be reviewed again in 2025. At the 51st session of the Statistical Commission (held in New York City from 3–6 March 2020) a total of 36 changes to the global indicator framework were proposed for the Commission's consideration. Some indicators were replaced, revised or deleted. Between 15 October 2018 and 17 April 2020, other changes were made to the indicators. Yet their measurement continues to be fraught with difficulties.

Listing of 17 goals with their targets and indicators

Goal 1: No poverty 

SDG 1 is to: "End poverty in all its forms everywhere". Achieving SDG 1 would end extreme poverty globally by 2030. One of its indicators is the proportion of population living below the poverty line.  The data gets analyzed by sex, age, employment status, and geographical location (urban/rural).

Goal 2: Zero hunger (No hunger) 

SDG 2 is to: "End hunger, achieve food security and improved nutrition, and promote sustainable agriculture". Indicators for this goal are for example the prevalence of undernourishment, prevalence of severe food insecurity, and prevalence of stunting among children under five years of age.

Goal 3: Good health and well-being  

SDG 3 is to: "Ensure healthy lives and promote well-being for all at all ages". Important indicators here are life expectancy as well as child and maternal mortality. Further indicators are for example deaths from road traffic injuries, prevalence of current tobacco use, suicide mortality rate.

Goal 4: Quality education 

SDG 4 is to: "Ensure inclusive and equitable quality education and promote lifelong learning opportunities for all". The indicators for this goal are for example attendance rates at primary schools, completion rates of primary school education, participation in tertiary education and so forth. In each case, parity indices are looked at to ensure that disadvantaged students do not miss out (data is collected on "female/male, rural/urban, bottom/top wealth quintile and others such as disability status, indigenous peoples") . There is also an indicator around the facilities that the school buildings have (access to electricity, the internet, computers, drinking water, toilets etc.).

Goal 5: Gender equality 

SDG 5 is to: "Achieve gender equality and empower all women and girls". Indicators include for example having suitable legal frameworks and the representation by women in national parliament or in local deliberative bodies. Numbers on forced marriage and female genital mutilation/cutting (FGM/C) are also included in another indicator.

Goal 6: Clean water and sanitation 

SDG 6 is to: "Ensure availability and sustainable management of water and sanitation for all". The Joint Monitoring Programme (JMP) of WHO and UNICEF is responsible for monitoring progress to achieve the first two targets of this goal. Important indicators for this goal are the percentages of the population that uses safely managed drinking water, and has access to safely managed sanitation. The JMP reported in 2017 that 4.5 billion people do not have safely managed sanitation.  Another indicator looks at the proportion of domestic and industrial wastewater that is safely treated.

Goal 7: Affordable and clean energy 

SDG 7 is to: "Ensure access to affordable, reliable, sustainable and modern energy for all". One of the indicators for this goal is the percentage of population with access to electricity (progress in expanding access to electricity has been made in several countries, notably India, Bangladesh, and Kenya). Other indicators look at the renewable energy share and energy efficiency.

Goal 8: Decent work and economic growth 

SDG 8 is to: "Promote sustained, inclusive and sustainable economic growth, full and productive employment and decent work for all". Important indicators for this goal include economic growth in least developed countries and the rate of real GDP per capita. Further examples are rates of youth unemployment and occupational injuries or the number of women engaged in the labor force compared to men.

Goal 9: Industry, Innovation and Infrastructure 

SDG 9 is to: "Build resilient infrastructure, promote inclusive and sustainable industrialization, and foster innovation". Indicators in this goal include for example the proportion of people who are employed in manufacturing activities or who are living in areas covered by a mobile network or who have access to the internet. An indicator that is connected to climate change is "CO2 emissions per unit of value added".

Goal 10: Reduced inequality 

SDG 10 is to: "Reduce income inequality within and among countries". Important indicators for this SDG are income disparities, aspects of gender and disability, as well as policies for migration and mobility of people.

Goal 11: Sustainable cities and communities 

SDG 11 is to: "Make cities and human settlements inclusive, safe, resilient, and sustainable". Important indicators for this goal are the number of people living in urban slums, the proportion of the urban population who has convenient access to public transport, and the extent of built-up area per person.

Goal 12: Responsible consumption and production 

SDG 12 is to: "Ensure sustainable consumption and production patterns". One of the indicators is the number of national policy instrument to promote sustainable consumption and production patterns. Another one is global fossil fuel subsidies. An increase in domestic recycling and a reduced reliance on the global plastic waste trade are other actions that might help meet the goal.

Goal 13: Climate action 

SDG 13 is to: "Take urgent action to combat climate change and its impacts by regulating emissions and promoting developments in renewable energy". In 2021 to early 2023, the Intergovernmental Panel on Climate Change (IPCC) published its Sixth Assessment Report which assesses scientific, technical, and socio-economic information concerning climate change.

Goal 14: Life below water 

SDG 14 is to: "Conserve and sustainably use the oceans, seas and marine resources for sustainable development". The current efforts to protect oceans, marine environments and small-scale fishers are not meeting the need to protect the resources. Increased ocean temperatures and oxygen loss act concurrently with ocean acidification and constitute the deadly trio of climate change pressures on the marine environment.

Goal 15: Life on land 

SDG 15 is to: "Protect, restore and promote sustainable use of terrestrial ecosystems, sustainably manage forests, combat desertification, and halt and reverse land degradation and halt biodiversity loss". The proportion of remaining forest area, desertification and species extinction risk are example indicators of this goal.

Goal 16: Peace, justice and strong institutions 

SDG 16 is to: "Promote peaceful and inclusive societies for sustainable development, provide access to justice for all and build effective, accountable and inclusive institutions at all levels". Rates of birth registration and prevalence of bribery are two examples of indicators included in this goal.

Goal 17: Partnership for the goals 

SDG 17 is to: "Strengthen the means of implementation and revitalize the global partnership for sustainable development". Increasing international cooperation is seen as vital to achieving each of the 16 previous goals. Developing multi-stakeholder partnerships to share knowledge, expertise, technology, and financial support is seen as critical to overall success of the SDGs. The goal encompasses improving north–south and South-South cooperation, and public-private partnerships which involve civil societies are specifically mentioned.

Cross-cutting issues and synergies 
To achieve sustainable development, three aspects or dimensions need to come together: The economic, socio-political, and environmental dimensions are all critically important and interdependent. Progress will require multidisciplinary and trans-disciplinary research across all three sectors. This proves difficult when major governments fail to support it.  

Cross cutting issues include for example gender equality, education, culture and health. These are just some examples of various interlinkages inherent in the SDGs.

Gender equality 
The widespread consensus is that progress on all of the SDGs will be stalled if women's empowerment and gender equality are not prioritized, and treated holistically. The SDGs look to policy makers as well as private sector executives and board members to work toward gender equality. Statements from diverse sources, such as the Organisation for Economic Cooperation and Development (OECD), UN Women and the World Pensions Forum, have noted that investments in women and girls have positive impacts on economies. National and global development investments in women and girls often exceed their initial scope.

Gender equality is mainstreamed throughout the SDG framework by ensuring that as much sex-disaggregated data as possible are collected.

Education and culture  
Education for sustainable development (ESD) is explicitly recognized in the SDGs as part of Target 4.7 of the SDG on education. UNESCO promotes the Global Citizenship Education (GCED) as a complementary approach. Education for sustainable development is important for all the other 16 SDGs.

Culture is explicitly referenced in SDG 11 Target 4 ("Strengthen efforts to protect and safeguard the world's cultural and natural heritage"). However, culture is seen as a cross-cutting theme because it impacts several SDGs. For example, culture plays a role in SDG targets where they relate to environment and resilience (within SDGs 11, 12 and 16), prosperity and livelihoods (within SDG 8), inclusion and participation (within SDG 11 and 16).

Health 
SDGs 1 to 6 directly address health disparities, primarily in developing countries. These six goals address key issues in Global Public Health, Poverty, Hunger and Food security, Health, Education, Gender equality and women's empowerment, and water and sanitation. Public health officials can use these goals to set their own agenda and plan for smaller scale initiatives for their organizations. 

The links between the various sustainable development goals and public health are numerous and well established:

 SDG 1: Living below the poverty line is attributed to poorer health outcomes and can be even worse for persons living in developing countries where extreme poverty is more common. A child born into poverty is twice as likely to die before the age of five compared to a child from a wealthier family.
 SDG 2: The detrimental effects of hunger and malnutrition that can arise from systemic challenges with food security are enormous. The World Health Organization estimates that 12.9 percent of the population in developing countries is undernourished.
 SDG 4 and 5: Educational equity has yet to be reached in the world. Public health efforts are impeded by this, as a lack of education can lead to poorer health outcomes. This is shown by children of mothers who have no education having a lower survival rate compared to children born to mothers with primary or greater levels of education.

Synergies 
Synergies amongst the SDGs are "the good antagonists of trade-offs".With regards to SDG 13 on climate action, the IPCC sees robust synergies particularly for the SDGs 3 (health), 7 (clean energy), 11 (cities and communities), 12 (responsible consumption and production) and 14 (oceans).

To meet SDG 13 and other SDGs, sustained long-term investment in green innovation is required: to decarbonize the physical capital stock – energy, industry, and transportation infrastructure – and ensure its resilience to a changing future climate; to preserve and enhance natural capital – forests, oceans, and wetlands; and to train people to work in a climate-neutral economy.

Challenges

Too many goals and overall problems 

Scholars have pointed out flaws in the design of the SDGs for the following aspects: "the number of goals, the structure of the goal framework (for example, the non-hierarchical structure), the coherence between the goals, the specificity or measurability of the targets, the language used in the text, and their reliance on neoliberal economic development-oriented sustainable development as their core orientation".

The SDGs may simply maintain the status quo and fall short of delivering an ambitious development agenda. The current status quo has been described as "separating human wellbeing and environmental sustainability, failing to change governance and to pay attention to trade-offs, root causes of poverty and environmental degradation, and social justice issues".

A commentary in The Economist in 2015 argued that 169 targets for the SDGs is too many, describing them as sprawling, misconceived and a mess compared to the eight Millennium Development Goals (MDGs).

Henrik Dahl, a Danish sociologist and Member of Parliament among others has repeatedly criticized the implementation of the SDGs in Danish schools and universities as going against the free thought principles of Denmark accusing the universites of "transforming themselves into a political-pseudo-religious preaching factory".

Trade-offs not explicitly addressed 
The trade-offs among the 17 SDGs might prevent their realization. For example, these are three difficult trade-offs to consider: "How can ending hunger be reconciled with environmental sustainability? (SDG targets 2.3 and 15.2) How can economic growth be reconciled with environmental sustainability? (SDG targets 9.2 and 9.4) How can income inequality be reconciled with economic growth? (SDG targets 10.1 and 8.1)."

The SDGs do not specifically address the tensions between economic growth and environmental sustainability. Instead, they emphasize "longstanding but dubious claims about decoupling and resource efficiency as technological solutions to the environmental crisis". For example, continued global economic growth of 3 percent (SDG 8) may not be reconcilable with ecological sustainability goals, because the required rate of absolute global eco-economic decoupling is far higher than any country has achieved in the past.

Weak on environmental sustainability 

Scholars have criticized that the SDGs "fail to recognize that planetary, people and prosperity concerns are all part of one earth system, and that the protection of planetary integrity should not be a means to an end, but an end in itself". The SDGs "remain fixated on the idea that economic growth is foundational to achieve all pillars of sustainable development". They do not prioritize environmental protection.

The SDGs include three environment-focused SDGs, which are Goal 13, 14 and 15 (climate, land and oceans), but there is no overarching environmental or planetary goal. The SDGs do not pursue planetary integrity as such.

Environmental constraints and planetary boundaries are underrepresented within the SDGs. For instance, the way the current SDGs are structured leads to a negative correlation between environmental sustainability and SDGs. 

The SDGs have been criticized for their inability to protect biodiversity. They could unintentionally promote environmental destruction in the name of sustainable development.

Certain studies also argue that the focus of the SDGs on neoliberal sustainable development is detrimental to planetary integrity and justice. Both of these ambitions (planetary integrity and justice) would require limits to economic growth.

Scientists have proposed several ways to address the weaknesses regarding environmental sustainability in the SDGs:

 The monitoring of essential variables to better capture the essence of coupled environmental and social systems that underpin sustainable development, helping to guide coordination and systems transformation.
 More attention to the context of the biophysical systems in different places (e.g., coastal river deltas, mountain areas)
 Better understanding of feedbacks across scales in space (e.g., through globalization) and time (e.g., affecting future generations) that could ultimately determine the success or failure of the SDGs.

Ethical aspects 
There are concerns about the ethical orientation of the SDGs: they remain "underpinned by strong (Western) modernist notions of development: sovereignty of humans over their environment (anthropocentricism), individualism, competition, freedom (rights rather than duties), self-interest, belief in the market leading to collective welfare, private property (protected by legal systems), rewards based on merit, materialism, quantification of value, and instrumentalization of labor".

Some studies warn that the SDGs could be used to camouflage business-as-usual by disguising it using SDG-related sustainability rhetoric. A meta-analysis review study in 2022 found that: "There is even emerging evidence that the SDGs might have even adverse effects, by providing a "smokescreen of hectic political activity" that blurs a reality of stagnation, dead ends and business-as-usual".

Difficulties with tracking qualitative indicators 
Regarding the targets of the SDGs, there is generally weak evidence linking the means of implementation to outcomes. The targets about means of implementation (those denoted with a letter, for example, Target 6.a) are imperfectly conceptualized and inconsistently formulated, and tracking their largely qualitative indicators will be difficult.

Monitoring mechanism

UN High-Level Political Forum on Sustainable Development (HLPF) 

The High-level Political Forum on Sustainable Development (HLPF) replaced the United Nations Commission on Sustainable Development in 2012. It should be a "regular meeting place for governments and non-state representatives to assess global progress towards sustainable development". The meetings take place under the auspices of the United Nations economic and Social Council. In July 2020 the meeting took place online for the first time due to the COVID-19 pandemic. The theme was "Accelerated action and transformative pathways: realizing the decade of action and delivery for sustainable development" and a ministerial declaration was adopted.

High-level progress reports for all the SDGs are published in the form of reports by the United Nations Secretary General. The most recent one is from April 2020.

However, the HLPF has a range of problems. It has not been able to promote system-wide coherence. The reasons for this include its broad and unclear mandate combined with a lack of resources and divergent national interests. Therefore, this reporting system is mainly just a platform for voluntary reporting and peer learning among governments.

Monitoring tools and websites 
The online publication SDG-Tracker was launched in June 2018 and presents data across all available indicators. It relies on the Our World in Data database and is also based at the University of Oxford. The publication has global coverage and tracks whether the world is making progress towards the SDGs. It aims to make the data on the 17 goals available and understandable to a wide audience. The SDG-Tracker highlights that the world is currently (early 2019) very far away from achieving the goals.

The Global SDG Index and Dashboards Report is the first publication to track countries' performance on all 17 Sustainable Development Goals. The annual publication, co-produced by Bertelsmann Stiftung and SDSN, includes a ranking and dashboards that show key challenges for each country in terms of implementing the SDGs. The publication also shows an analysis of government efforts to implement the SDGs.

Reporting on progress

Overall status 
Reports by the United Nations (for example the UN Global Sustainable Development Report in 2019) and by other organizations who are tracking progress on the SDGs have repeatedly pointed out that the world is unlikely to achieve most of the targets by 2030 (or earlier for those targets that have an earlier target yet). This is called the world is not on track. Of particular concern - which cut across many of the SDGs - are rising inequalities, ongoing climate change and increasing biodiversity loss. In addition, there is a trade-off between the planetary boundaries of Earth and aspiration for wealth and well-being; this has been worded as follows: "the world’s social and natural biophysical systems cannot support the aspirations for universal human well-being embedded in the SDGs."

Due to various economic and social issues, many countries are seeing a major decline in the progress made. In Asia for example, data shows a loss of progress on goals 2, 8,10,11, and 15. Recommended approaches to still achieve the SDGs are: "Set priorities, focus on harnessing the environmental dimension of the SDGs, understand how the SDGs work as an indivisible system, and look for synergies".

Assessing the political impact of the SDGs 
A scientific assessment released in 2022 analysed the political impacts of the SDGs. It reviewed over 3,000 scientific articles, mainly from the social sciences. The study looked at possible discursive, normative and institutional effects. The presence of all three types of effects throughout a political system is defined as transformative impact, which is the eventual goal of the 2030 Agenda. 

Discursive effects relate to changes in global and national debates that make them more aligned with the SDGs. Normative effects would be adjustments in legislative and regulatory frameworks and policies in line with, and because of, the SDGs. Institutional effects would be the creation of new departments, committees, offices or programs linked to the achievement of the SDGs or the realignment of existing institutions.  

The review found that the SDGs have had only limited transformative political impact thus far. They have had mainly discursive effects only. For example, the broad uptake of the principle of leaving no one behind in pronouncements by policymakers and civil society activists is a discursive effect. The SDGs have also led to some isolated normative and institutional reforms. However, there is widespread doubt that the SDGs can steer societies towards more ecological integrity at the planetary scale. This is because countries generally prioritize the more socioeconomic SDGs (e.g. SDGs 8 to 12) over the environmentally oriented ones (e.g. SDGs 13 to 15), which is in alignment with their long-standing national development policies.

Impacts of COVID-19 pandemic 
The COVID-19 pandemic in 2020 had impacts on all 17 goals. It has become "the worst human and economic crisis in a lifetime". The pandemic threatened progress made in particular for SDG 3 (health), SDG 4 (education), SDG 6 (water and sanitation for all), SDG 10 (reduce inequality) and SDG 17 (partnerships).

Uneven priorities of goals 
In 2019 five progress reports on the 17 SDGs were published. Three came from the United Nations Department of Economic and Social Affairs (UNDESA), one from the Bertelsmann Foundation and one from the European Union. A review of the five reports analyzed which of the 17 Goals were addressed in priority and which ones were left behind. In explanation of the findings, the Basel Institute of Commons and Economics said Biodiversity, Peace and Social Inclusion were "left behind" by quoting the official SDGs motto "Leaving no one behind".

It has been argued that governments and businesses actively prioritize the social and economic goals over the environmental goals (such as Goal 14 and 15) in both rhetoric and practice.

Costs

Cost estimates 
The United Nations estimates that for Africa, considering the continent's population growth, yearly funding of $1.3 trillion would be needed to achieve the Sustainable Development Goals in Africa. The International Monetary Fund also estimates that $50 billion may be needed only to cover the expenses of climate adaptation.

Estimates for providing clean water and sanitation for the whole population of all continents have been as high as US$200 billion. The World Bank says that estimates need to be made country by country, and reevaluated frequently over time.

In 2014, UNCTAD estimated the annual costs to achieving the UN Goals at US$2.5 trillion per year. Another estimate from 2018 (by the Basel Institute of Commons and Economics, that conducts the World Social Capital Monitor) found that to reach all of the SDGs this would require between US$2.5 and $5.0 trillion per year.

Allocation of funds 
In 2017 the UN launched the Inter-agency Task Force on Financing for Development (UN IATF on FfD) that invited to a public dialogue. The top-5 sources of financing for development were estimated in 2018 to be: Real new sovereign debt OECD countries, military expenditures, official increase sovereign debt OECD countries, remittances from expats to developing countries, official development assistance (ODA).

The Rockefeller Foundation asserted in 2017 that "The key to financing and achieving the SDGs lies in mobilizing a greater share of the $200+ trillion in annual private capital investment flows toward development efforts, and philanthropy has a critical role to play in catalyzing this shift." Large-scale funders participating in a Rockefeller Foundation-hosted design thinking workshop concluded that "while there is a moral imperative to achieve the SDGs, failure is inevitable if there aren't drastic changes to how we go about financing large scale change".

A meta-analysis published in 2022 found that there was scant evidence that governments have substantially reallocated funding to implement the SDGs, either for national implementation or for international cooperation. The SDGs do not seem to have changed public budgets and financial allocation mechanisms in any important way, except for some local governance contexts. National budgets cannot easily be reallocated.

SDG-driven investment 
Capital stewardship is expected to play a crucial part in the progressive advancement of the SDG agenda to "shift the economic system towards sustainable investment by using the SDG framework across all asset classes". The notion of SDG Driven Investment gained further ground amongst institutional investors in  2019. 

In 2017, 2018 and early 2019, the World Pensions Council (WPC) held a series of ESG-focused (Environmental, Social and Governance) discussions with pension board members (trustees) and senior investment executives from across G20 nations. Many pension investment executives and board members confirmed they were in the process of adopting or developing SDG-informed investment processes, with more ambitious investment governance requirements – notably when it comes to climate action, gender equality and social fairness.

Some studies, however, warn of selective implementation of SDGs and political risks linked to private investments in the context of continued shortage of public funding.

Communication and advocacy 

UN agencies which are part of the United Nations Development Group decided to support an independent campaign to communicate the new SDGs to a wider audience. This campaign, Project Everyone, had the support of corporate institutions and other international organizations.

Using the text drafted by diplomats at the UN level, a team of communication specialists developed icons for every goal. They also shortened the title The 17 Sustainable Development Goals to Global Goals, then ran workshops and conferences to communicate the Global Goals to a global audience.

The Aarhus Convention is a United Nations convention passed in 2001, explicitly to encourage and promote effective public engagement in environmental decision making. Information transparency related to social media and the engagement of youth are two issues related to the Sustainable Development Goals that the convention has addressed.

Advocates 
In 2019 and then in 2021, United Nations Secretary-General António Guterres appointed 17 SDG advocates. The role of the public figures is to raise awareness, inspire greater ambition, and push for faster action on the SDGs. They are:

Co-Chairs
 Mia Mottley, Prime Minister of Barbados.
 Justin Trudeau, Prime Minister of Canada.

Members
 Queen Mathilde of the Belgians
 Muhammadu Sanusi II, Emir of Kano.
 Sheikha Moza bint Nasser, founder of the Education Above All Foundation.
 BLACKPINK , girl K-Pop group
 Richard Curtis, screenwriter, producer and film director.
 Ms. Hindou Oumarou Ibrahim, environmental and indigenous rights activist.
 Graça Machel, founder of Graça Machel Trust.
 Dia Mirza, actress, film producer, and UN Environment Program Goodwill Ambassador for India.
 Valentina Muñoz Rabanal , Chilean stem activist.
 Edward Ndopu, founder of Global Strategies on Inclusive Education.
 Kailash Satyarthi , Indian childrens' rights activist
 Brad Smith , Vice Chairman and President, Microsoft.
 Jeffrey Sachs, director of the Center for Sustainable Development at Columbia University.
 Forest Whitaker, actor, founder and CEO of Whitaker Peace & Development Initiative.
 Hamdi Ulukaya, founder of Chobani

Global events 

Global Goals Week is an annual week-long event in September for action, awareness, and accountability for the Sustainable Development Goals. It is a shared commitment for over 100 partners to ensure quick action on the SDGs by sharing ideas and transformative solutions to global problems. It first took place in 2016. It is often held concurrently with Climate Week NYC.

The Arctic Film Festival is an annual film festival organized by HF Productions and supported by the SDGs' Partnership Platform. Held for the first time in 2019, the festival is expected to take place every year in September in Longyearbyen, Svalbard, Norway.

History 

The Post-2015 Development Agenda was a process from 2012 to 2015 led by the United Nations to define the future global development framework that would succeed the Millennium Development Goals. The SDGs were developed to succeed the Millennium Development Goals (MDGs) which ended in 2015. 

In 1983, the United Nations created the World Commission on Environment and Development (later known as the Brundtland Commission), which defined sustainable development as "meeting the needs of the present without compromising the ability of future generations to meet their own needs". In 1992, the first United Nations Conference on Environment and Development (UNCED) or Earth Summit was held in Rio de Janeiro, where the first agenda for Environment and Development, also known as Agenda 21, was developed and adopted.

In 2012, the United Nations Conference on Sustainable Development (UNCSD), also known as Rio+20, was held as a 20-year follow up to UNCED. Colombia proposed the idea of the SDGs at a preparation event for Rio+20 held in Indonesia in July 2011. In September 2011, this idea was picked up by the United Nations Department of Public Information 64th NGO Conference in Bonn, Germany. The outcome document proposed 17 sustainable development goals and associated targets. In the run-up to Rio+20 there was much discussion about the idea of the SDGs. At the Rio+20 Conference, a resolution known as "The Future We Want" was reached by member states. Among the key themes agreed on were poverty eradication, energy, water and sanitation, health, and human settlement.

In January 2013, the 30-member UN General Assembly Open Working Group (OWG) on Sustainable Development Goals was established to identify specific goals for the SDGs. The OWG submitted their proposal of 8 SDGs and 169 targets to the 68th session of the General Assembly in September 2014. On 5 December 2014, the UN General Assembly accepted the Secretary General's Synthesis Report, which stated that the agenda for the post-2015 SDG process would be based on the OWG proposals.

Country examples

Asia and Pacific

Australia

Africa 

The United Nations Development Programme (UNDP) has collected information to show how awareness about the SDGs among government officers, civil society and others has been created in many African countries.

Nigeria

Europe and Middle East

Baltic nations, via the Council of the Baltic Sea States, have created the Baltic 2030 Action Plan.

Lebanon

United Kingdom 
The UK's approach to delivering the Global SDGs is outlined in Agenda 2030: Delivering the Global Goals, developed by the Department for International Development. In 2019, the Bond network analyzed the UK's global progress on the Sustainable Development Goals (SDGs).  The Bond report highlights crucial gaps where attention and investment are most needed. The report was compiled by 49 organizations and 14 networks and working groups.

See also 

 Sustainability

References

External links

UN Sustainable Development Knowledge Platform – The SDGs
"Global Goals" Campaign Campaign on the SDGs published by Project Everyone
Global SDG Indicators Database of the United Nations
SDG-Tracker.org – Visualized tracking of progress towards the SDGs 
SDG Pathfinder – Explore content on SDGs from six international organizations (powered by the OECD)

International sustainable development
United Nations documents
Global policy organizations
Sustainable development
 
Sustainability